Roberts is a surname of English and Welsh origin, deriving from the given name Robert, meaning "bright renown" – from the Germanic elements "hrod" meaning renown and "beraht" meaning bright. The surname, meaning "son of Robert", is common in North Wales and elsewhere in the United Kingdom. It may also be an Anglicization of the French surname Robert, commonly adopted by Quebec emigrants.

People

Fictional characters
 Alf Roberts, Audrey Roberts and Renee Roberts, from British soap opera Coronation Street
 Barbara Millicent Roberts, doll known as Barbie
 Dread Pirate Roberts, a character in The Princess Bride
 Irene Roberts, from Australian soap opera Home and Away 
 Skipper Roberts, doll known as Skipper
 Summer Roberts, from American television series The O.C.
 Tutti and Todd Roberts, dolls known as Tutti and Todd
 Renée Roberts, English dubbed name for Zakuro Fujiwara in Tokyo Mew Mew

See also
 Roberts family (Liberia)
 Robert (surname)
 Robertson (disambiguation)
 Roberts (disambiguation)
 Robarts (disambiguation)
 Robards

Notes

English-language surnames
Welsh-language surnames
Patronymic surnames
Surnames from given names